Rock oil may refer to:
 Naphtha, also called "rock oil"
 Petroleum, which literally means "rock oil"
 Rock Oil, a Garfield character
 Rock oil (Scotland), a substance gathered off sea rocks and used medicinally

See also
 Oil Rocks, an industrial settlement in Baku, Azerbaijan